Linesøya is an island in the municipality of Åfjord in Trøndelag county, Norway.

After the completion in 2011 of the Linesøy Bridge between Linesøya and Stokkøya and the Stokkøy Bridge from Stokkøya to the mainland, there has been a ferry-free road to the mainland from Linesøya.

See also
List of islands of Norway

References

Islands of Trøndelag
Åfjord